Disha Patel (born 17 January 1986) known professionally as Disha Vadgama  is an Indian fashion designer with her own label called DV Fashion Studio.  Disha has also participated at the Bombay Fashion Week.

Personal life 
Disha Vadgama was born in Rajkot, Gujarat.

Career 
Seven years back Disha started with just 500 square feet of space. She represented India at the Philippines International Beauty pageant.

Filmography

As a costume designer

References

External links 
 
 Disha Vadgama Website

1986 births
Living people
Indian company founders
Indian fashion designers
Women founders
Indian costume designers